Peter Fleming and John McEnroe defeated Brian Gottfried and Raúl Ramírez in the final, 4–6, 6–4, 6–2, 6–2 to win the gentlemen's doubles title at the 1979 Wimbledon Championships. It was both men's first major men's doubles title.

Bob Hewitt and Frew McMillan were the defending champions, but were defeated in the semifinals by Fleming and McEnroe.

Seeds

  Peter Fleming /  John McEnroe (champions)
  Wojciech Fibak /  Tom Okker (first round)
  Bob Lutz /  Stan Smith (second round)
  Bob Hewitt /  Frew McMillan (semifinals)
  Marty Riessen /  Sherwood Stewart (second round)
  Sandy Mayer /  Gene Mayer (third round, withdrew)
  Brian Gottfried /  Raúl Ramírez (semifinals)
  Jan Kodeš /  Tomáš Šmíd (third round)
  Víctor Pecci /  Balázs Taróczy (first round)
  Mark Edmondson /  John Marks (second round)
 n/a
  John Alexander /  Phil Dent (quarterfinals)
  Ross Case /  Geoff Masters (quarterfinals)
  Colin Dowdeswell /  Heinz Günthardt (second round)
  Tim Gullikson /  Tom Gullikson (second round)
  Bruce Manson /  Andrew Pattison (first round)

Draw

Finals

Top half

Section 1

Section 2

Bottom half

Section 3

Section 4

References

External links

1979 Wimbledon Championships – Men's draws and results at the International Tennis Federation

Men's Doubles
Wimbledon Championship by year – Men's doubles